Monarch is an unincorporated community in Cascade County, Montana, United States.

History
Monarch has existed since the early days of mining in the Little Belt Mountains of Cascade County. Other mining claims were called King, Czar, Emperor, Rex, and Sultan. The Montana Central Railway connected Monarch to Great Falls in 1889. The line continued operation until November 3, 1945.

Geography
Monarch is located in the Little Belt Mountains of central Montana, southeast of Great Falls, on US Highway 89 in the Lewis and Clark National Forest. Monarch is a mountain community and sits at an elevation of 4,560 feet.

Climate
According to the Köppen Climate Classification system, Monarch has a semi-arid climate, abbreviated "BSk" on climate maps.

Demographics

References

Unincorporated communities in Cascade County, Montana
Unincorporated communities in Montana
Populated places established in 1889